Lachlan George Dreher (born 11 April 1967 in Melbourne, Victoria) is a former field hockey goalkeeper from Australia, who competed in three consecutive Summer Olympics for his native country, starting in 1992.

References
 Profile on Hockey Australia

External links
 

1967 births
Australian male field hockey players
Male field hockey goalkeepers
Olympic field hockey players of Australia
Field hockey players at the 1992 Summer Olympics
Field hockey players at the 1996 Summer Olympics
Field hockey players at the 2000 Summer Olympics
1998 Men's Hockey World Cup players
2002 Men's Hockey World Cup players
Field hockey players from Melbourne
Living people
Olympic silver medalists for Australia
Olympic bronze medalists for Australia
Olympic medalists in field hockey
Medalists at the 2000 Summer Olympics
Medalists at the 1996 Summer Olympics
Medalists at the 1992 Summer Olympics
20th-century Australian people